Joseph Czerny (June 17, 1785, Hořovice - January 7, 1842, Vienna) was a composer, pianist, and piano teacher from the Austrian Empire. Among his compositions is variation number 5 for Part II of the Vaterländischer Künstlerverein. Among his pupils were Leopoldine Blahetka (1809–1885) and Ludwig van Beethoven's nephew, Karl. His variations were not well received by the English magazine The Harmonicon: "His variations, seven in number, have nothing new in them; they pursue the same track that has been beaten for many years past, and have, under various names, nauseated the ear during a long quarter of a century at least."

References

1785 births
1842 deaths
Composers from the Austrian Empire
People from Beroun District